Sweetwater Branch is a stream in the U.S. state of Georgia. It is a tributary to the North River.

Sweetwater Branch most likely was named for the fresh water which flows in this stream.

References

Rivers of Georgia (U.S. state)
Rivers of Camden County, Georgia